Kalocsai Futball Club is a professional football club based in Kalocsa, Bács-Kiskun County, Hungary, that competes in the Bács-Kiskun county league.

Name changes
1913–?: Kalocsai SC
?-1949: Kalocsai SE
1949–1951: Kalocsai SzSE
1951–1966: Kalocsai Kinizsi SK
1966: merger with Kalocsai Spartacus
1966–1975: Kalocsai VTSK
1975–1991: Kalocsai SE
1991–present: Kalocsai Futball Club

Honours
Szabadföld Kupa
Runner-up: 1993

External links
 Profile on Magyar Futball

References

Football clubs in Hungary
Association football clubs established in 1913
1913 establishments in Hungary
Megyei Bajnokság I